Bahía de Banderas (Spanish for Bay of Flags) is a bay on the Pacific Coast of Mexico, within the Mexican states of Jalisco and Nayarit. It is also the name of an administrative municipality, located on the bay in Nayarit state.  The port and resort city of Puerto Vallarta is on the bay.

Geology
The Bahía de Banderas is regarded by most geologists as the original attachment point for the southern cape of the Baja California Peninsula before it was rifted off the North American Plate millions of years ago, forming the Gulf of California.

Geography

The Bahía de Banderas (Banderas Bay) on the Pacific Ocean is bounded on the north by Punta Mita (Mita Point), and on the south by Cabo Corrientes (Cape Corrientes). Though locally regarded so, it is not the largest bay in Mexico.

Tourism is very important to the local economies, and the Bahía de Banderas coast is an important location of tourist facilities development in both states. Puerto Vallarta has been the longstanding primary resort destination and cruise ship port of the bay. However, beyond the city on the long  coastline, other attractive beaches and landscapes have since been developed to serve visitors.

Bahía de Banderas (Banderas Bay) is also an important breeding and birthing ground for the humpback whale.

Unlike the rest of the municipalities of Nayarit, Bahía de Banderas follows the Central Time Zone, as used in the neighboring municipality of Puerto Vallarta, Jalisco. This is in order to allow for greater integration with the touristic region of Puerto Vallarta, as well as to prevent time zone confusions that could lead to missed flights on account of the local airport being across the state border in Puerto Vallarta. This time zone is represented in the Olson database as America/Bahia_Banderas.

Municipality
The Municipality of Bahía de Banderas in Nayarit state has a total area of 773.3 km². It was created in 1989. Its westernmost headland is Punta Mita, to the south it is on the Bahía de Banderas, and northwards it is on the open Pacific Ocean.

The municipality had a population of 83,739 in 2005 (59,808 in 2000). The long valley of Banderas, and abundance of water, allow for extensive cattle raising. The mountains contain an important ecological reserve in the eastern section.

By Decree number 7261, issued on 11 December 1989 by the Congress of the Free and Sovereign State of Nayarit, the new municipality of Bahía de Banderas was created, which would separate it territorially from the municipality of Compostela, becoming part of the political division of the state of Nayarit as municipality number 20.

Location
The municipality of Bahía de Banderas borders Compostela in Nayarit to the north; the municipalities of Puerto Vallarta and San Sebastián del Oeste, both in Jalisco, to the south, the southeast, and the east; and the Bahía de Banderas and the Pacific Ocean to the west.

Towns
The municipal seat is the town of Valle de Banderas, with a population of 5,057 in 2005.  Other towns are San Juan de Abajo (8,159), Bucerías (5,711), San José del Valle (5,188), San Vicente (3,543), and Jarretaderas (3,426).

Economy
The municipality's economy is based on tourism, sea fishing, and agriculture.

The main crops are corn (maize), beans, sorghum, tobacco, rice, watermelon and mango. Exotic fruits like papaya, litchi, and guanábana are also grown. Most of the planted area is irrigated. There are several packing houses for papaya and other fruits.

Government

Municipal presidents

See also
Ameca River — bay tributary.
Valle de Banderas — municipal seat.
Municipalities of Jalisco
Municipalities of Nayarit

References

External links

VirtualVallarta.com: Banderas Bay (Bahía de Banderas)
INEGI — National statistics 
Enciclopedia de los Municipios de Mexico

Banderas
Landforms of Jalisco
Landforms of Nayarit
Puerto Vallarta
Municipalities of Nayarit